Anthony Mbu Agogo Modeste (born 14 April 1988) is a French professional footballer who plays as a striker for German Bundesliga club Borussia Dortmund.

Early and personal life
His father Guy Modeste was also a footballer.

Club career

Nice
Modeste started his career as a teenager at French club Nice. He showed glimpses of his huge potential when he played for Nice, with several very impressive performances for one so young. During the 2009–2010 season, Modeste was loaned out to Angers. At only 21 years of age, Modeste proved to be a huge success at Angers, scoring 20 league goals during that season and also being named in the League's team of the season. His eye catching performances during his loan spell at Angers attracted the interest of several big French and English clubs.

Bordeaux
On 13 August 2010, Modeste joined Bordeaux from OGC Nice for an undisclosed fee thought to be €3.5 million and signed a four-year contract with the club.

On 19 January 2012, Modeste joined Blackburn Rovers on loan for the rest of the 2011–12 Premier League season, with his French employers insisting there would be no option to buy at the end of the loan period.

Blackburn Rovers got relegated in the 2011–12 Premier League season after Modeste got a red card in one of the final games of the season against West Bromwich Albion which Blackburn ultimately lost 3–0 and made survival for the next season practically impossible.

On 31 July 2012, he signed on loan for Bastia. He scored on his debut in a 3–2 victory over Sochaux. His lone season at Bastia was a huge success, as he scored 15 league goals in the French top division and he set up many other goals for teammates. He was Bastia's best player of that season.

1899 Hoffenheim
On 9 July 2013, Modeste signed with 1899 Hoffenheim on a three-year contract. Modeste made his club debut in the DFB-Pokal at fifth-tier SG Aumund-Vegesack on 3 August, scoring two goals and assisting one. Modeste's Bundesliga debut came on 10 August against Nürnberg, scoring a goal in the 2–2 draw. The following weekend at Hamburg, Modeste scored a brace in the 1–5 victory, en route to scoring six goals in his first seven games in the Bundesliga with Hoffenheim.

After having started his first 15 matches with Hoffenheim, Modeste was demoted from the starting lineup in favor of Sven Schipplock after a string of three consecutive losses, and four in five matches. On 8 February 2014, entering as a substitute, Modeste scored a late equaliser against Freiburg, scoring for the first time since late September. On 2 March against Wolfsburg, Modeste made his first start since late November, scoring two goals and assisting another in the 6–2 victory. Modeste scored in three consecutive matches in late March, including the first goal of a 3–3 draw at defending champions Bayern München before being forced off with injury. On 26 April against Eintracht Frankfurt, Modeste picked up a red card from a violent reaction towards opponent Carlos Zambrano, who appeared to have initiated the incident and went unpunished. Modeste was banned by the DFB for the final two matches of the season, finishing his year with 14 goals in 33 appearances in all competitions.

The summer signing of Ádám Szalai entering the 2014–15 season provided competition for Modeste at the lone striker position, and the two, along with Schipplock, all shared time throughout the year. As a result, Modeste's playing time was sporadic, and while he only made four fewer starts in the Bundesliga than the previous season, he only started two consecutive matches once prior to a six-game run in the starting lineup to end the season, compared to a thirteen-game run as well as a six-game run in the previous season. Modeste scored in four of his first five starts, but after a five-month scoring drought, he finished with just 7 goals in the Bundesliga. All told, in two seasons with Hoffenheim, Modeste featured in 62 competitive matches, scoring 23 goals in the process.

1. FC Köln

2015–16 season
On 26 June 2015, Modeste joined fellow German club 1. FC Köln for an undisclosed fee, signing a four-year deal. On 8 August 2015, Modeste marked his competitive debut by scoring a hat-trick in a 4–0 win at SV Meppen in the first round of the DFB-Pokal. His first goal came after just 45 seconds, making it the fastest DFB-Pokal cup goal in the history of 1. FC Köln. In his Bundesliga debut with Köln on 16 August, Modeste converted a penalty, which he earned himself after being fouled by goalkeeper Przemysław Tytoń, for a winner at Stuttgart, while later assisting Yuya Osako for the final goal in a 1–3 victory. Modeste scored in 7 of his first 9 matches in all competitions, highlighted by a penalty which he again earned himself against Hamburg on 29 August for the winner in a 2–1 victory, and a second half winner in a 1–0 victory against rivals Mönchengladbach on 19 September.

Appearing as a substitute for the first and only time that season, Modeste picked up the final goal in a 2–1 victory over Dortmund on 19 December at the end of normal time, scoring for the first time in nine games. Modeste entered the Christmas break with 7 goals in the Bundesliga, and opened his 2016 scoring account with goals in two games, and four goals in seven. On 17 April, Modeste scored a late winner in a 2–3 victory at Mainz. The following weekend, Modeste scored his first brace of the Bundesliga season, coming in a 4–1 victory over Darmstadt, and guaranteeing Köln's participation in the Bundesliga the next season. On the final day of the season, Modeste scored his 15th league goal in a 2–2 draw at Dortmund.

2016–17 season

After the season, Modeste was inquired upon by West Ham United as well as Chinese side Beijing Guoan, who made what was described as a "mega-offer" by Modeste. However, Modeste signed a new contract with Köln on 4 July 2016, running until the summer of 2021 and worth a reported €2.5 million annually, citing the medical care in Germany in regard to his son. Athletic director Jörg Schmadtke wanted to tender him a contract because of his "commitment to the club" as well as his "high worth" to the team, while also mentioning that he "proved that he is a good Bundesliga striker" in his first season with Köln.

The 2016–17 season began with incredibly impressive goal scoring form from Modeste. On 20 August 2016, in Köln's opening match of the season in the DFB-Pokal, Modeste scored the second goal in a 0–7 thrashing at sixth-tier BFC Preussen. The next weekend, the first of the 2016–17 Bundesliga, Modeste scored the second goal in a 2–0 victory over Darmstadt, his goal coming shortly after a weather stoppage. Modeste picked up his first brace of the season on 16 September against Freiburg in a 3–0 victory which brought Köln to the top of the table for the first time in roughly 20 years, while he also assisted Yuya Osako's equaliser and scored the winner at Schalke the following week.

Modeste scored in all 5 matches in October, beginning with an equaliser in a 1–1 draw against defending champions Bayern München at the Allianz Arena on 1 October. Modeste scored a brace in a 2–1 victory against Ingolstadt on 15 October to take the outright Bundesliga goal scoring lead with 7 goals, after nearly missing the game when he sustained an ankle injury in training. After scoring in Köln's first loss of the season, coming at Hertha BSC on 22 October, Modeste scored an extra-time winner against former club Hoffenheim in the second round of the Pokal the following week. On 30 October, Modeste scored his first hat trick of the season despite missing a penalty, coming against Hamburg in a 3–0 win, increasing his league-leading goal total to 11.

Tianjin Quanjian
Modeste was linked with Chinese Super League side Tianjin Quanjian in 2017 mid-year transfer window. However, 1. FC Köln officially terminated discussions on 28 June 2017 while the two clubs failed to agree on certain terms during negotiations. On 12 July, it was reported that Modeste was loaned to Tianjin Quanjian on a two-year long deal for €6 million, with an option to buy for an extra €29 million at the end. On 15 July 2017, Tianjin Quanjian announced the signing of Modeste. According to another press release, Modeste signed a -year contract, until the end of year 2020.

Return to 1. FC Köln
In August 2018, Modeste went AWOL and returned to Germany. On 17 November, he was given a contract to return to 1. FC Köln until 2023. Modeste also sued Tianjin Quanjian to FIFA in order to cancel the player contract, which the Chinese club made a counter-sue.

Loan to Saint-Étienne
On 1 February 2021, Köln announced that Modeste would join Ligue 1 club AS Saint-Étienne on a loan deal until the end of the season.

Borussia Dortmund
On 8 August 2022, Borussia Dortmund announced the arrival of Modeste in a tweet, "Bienvenue Tony!" from 1. FC Köln on a one-year contract to replace Sébastien Haller for a while. The 34-year-old forward was assigned the number 20.
On October 8, he scored a 95th minute equalizer in Der Klassiker against Bayern Munich in the Bundesliga to make the score 2-2.

Career statistics

Club

Honours
1. FC Köln
2. Bundesliga: 2018–19

References

External links

 Profile at the Borussia Dortmund website
 
 
 
 

1988 births
Living people
Sportspeople from Cannes
Association football forwards
French footballers
France under-21 international footballers
OGC Nice players
Angers SCO players
FC Girondins de Bordeaux players
Blackburn Rovers F.C. players
SC Bastia players
TSG 1899 Hoffenheim players
1. FC Köln players
Tianjin Tianhai F.C. players
AS Saint-Étienne players
Borussia Dortmund players
Ligue 1 players
Ligue 2 players
Premier League players
Bundesliga players
2. Bundesliga players
Chinese Super League players
French expatriate footballers
French expatriate sportspeople in England
French expatriate sportspeople in Germany
French expatriate sportspeople in China
Expatriate footballers in England
Expatriate footballers in Germany
Expatriate footballers in China
French people of Martiniquais descent
Black French sportspeople
Footballers from Provence-Alpes-Côte d'Azur